The Maikal Hills are range of hills in the state of eastern Madhya Pradesh and Chhattisgarh India. The Maikal Hills are an eastern part of the Satpuras in Kawardha District of Chhattisgarh and Anuppur district of Madhya Pradesh, overlooking the scenic town of Kawardha. Their altitudes range from 340 m to 942 m above sea level. This densely forested and thinly populated range gives rise to several streams and rivers including the tributaries of Narmada and Wainganga rivers. The hills are inhabited by two tribal peoples, the Baigas and the Gonds. The hill range is rich in flora and fauna wealth.

History
This region was once ruled by the Panduvamshis of Mekala. Their territory included parts of the present-day Mandla, Shahdol, and Bilaspur districts.

Culture 
Folk songs are part of the heritage of the tribal peoples of the Maikal Hills.

Geography
The Maikal are a hilly region in central India. This mountain range is one of the broad topographical divisions of Chhattisgarh. The landscape of Satpuda-Maikal extends for a distance of about five hundred kilometer. To one side of this stretch of landscape, the Achanakmar Wildlife Sanctuary of Chhattisgarh is located. On the other side of the Satpuda-Maikal lies the Melghat Tiger Reserve of Maharashtra. This stretch of land extends along with Satpuda and Maikal range in Chhattisgarh.

Natural Reserves
The following protected areas are located in the range:

Kanha National Park
Kanha National Park is a national park and a Tiger Reserve in the Mandla and Balaghat districts of Madhya Pradesh and located in the Maikal hills of the Satpuras. Besides harbouring a viable population of the tiger, Kanha has distinguished itself in saving the endangered hard ground barasingha from extinction, and supporting the last world population of this deer species

Geology
The hills are known to contain bauxite, an ore for aluminium.

References

External links

Hills of Chhattisgarh
Kabirdham district